Cairneyhill railway station served the village of Cairneyhill, Fife, Scotland from 1906 to 1930 on the Kincardine Line.

History 
The station opened on 2 July 1906 by the North British Railway, although it was used earlier by students of Sabbath School on 26 May of the same year. It closed to passengers on 7 July 1930.

References

External links 

Disused railway stations in Fife
Railway stations in Great Britain opened in 1906
Railway stations in Great Britain closed in 1930
Former North British Railway stations
1906 establishments in Scotland
1930 disestablishments in Scotland